Lee Yoo-young (born December 8, 1989) is a South Korean actress. She debuted in the film Late Spring (2014) for which she won Best Actress at the 14th Milan International Film Festival, making her the first Korean to receive the honor.

Personal life
In December 2016, Lee was confirmed to be in a relationship with Yourself and Yours (2016) co-star Kim Joo-hyuk until his death on October 30, 2017 in a traffic collision. 

On February 6, 2023, it was confirmed that Lee was dating a non-celebrity boyfriend.

Filmography

Film

Television series

Web series

Television show

Awards and nominations

References

External links 
 
 
 

1989 births
Living people
21st-century South Korean actresses
South Korean film actresses
South Korean television actresses
Korea National University of Arts alumni
Actresses from Seoul